Edmilson Indjai Correia (born 6 June 2000) is a Bissau-Guinean professional footballer who plays as a winger for Championnat National 3 side Saint-Étienne B.

Career
Edmilson arrived at Saint-Étienne in 2019 from Guinea Bissau. He made his professional debut with the club in a 0–0 Ligue 1 draw with Montpellier on 24 November 2019.

References

External links
 
 ASSE Profile

2000 births
Living people
Sportspeople from Bissau
Bissau-Guinean footballers
Association football wingers
AS Saint-Étienne players
Ligue 1 players
Championnat National 2 players
Championnat National 3 players
Bissau-Guinean expatriate footballers
Bissau-Guinean expatriate sportspeople in France
Expatriate footballers in France